Peter Cherrie (born 1 October 1983) is a Scottish football goalkeeper who plays for Irish side Dundalk .

Career

Cherrie started his career with Airdrie United. He played one game for them before moving to Ayr United.

Cherrie signed for Clyde after impressing in a trial and a subsequent glamour friendly with Manchester United in July 2005, which saw him come up against Ruud van Nistelrooy and Wayne Rooney. Cherrie made his competitive debut for Clyde against Peterhead in the Scottish League Cup in August 2005. Later that season, Cherrie played in the Bully Wee's Scottish Cup giant killing over Celtic.

Cherrie was released in May 2007 after his contract expired. However, he was brought back to the club by new manager Colin Hendry. Due to the good form of David Hutton, Cherrie didn't get a minute of first team action in the 2007–08 season, however, a series of good performances in Clyde's pre-season friendlies of 2008 saw him challenge Hutton for the #1 jersey, and he started his first competitive match for 18 months in August 2008. Cherrie was released by Clyde in June 2009 along with the rest of the out of contract players, due to the club's financial position.

On 8 July 2009, he signed for Irish side Dundalk. Since arriving at Dundalk, Cherrie's form has been excellent, making him one of the most favourite players amongst the Dundalk supporters. At the end of the 2010 Airtricity League season, Peter was voted as Dundalk's Player of the Year. On 29 October 2010, Peter signed a new one-year deal with Dundalk, keeping him with the club through the 2011 season. He once again signed a one-year deal with Dundalk on 31 January 2012. He made his 100th league appearance for Dundalk against Derry City in Oriel Park on 20 July 2012.

Peter signed for Bray Wanderers in July 2015 and made his debut keeping a clean sheet in their 1–0 win away at Limerick. He played every game from then until the end of the season helping Bray to an 8th-place finish and an FAI Cup semi-final. In November 2015, Cherrie signed a new two-year contract with Bray. Cherrie played every league match for Bray in 2017 and made a Bray Wanderers club record keeping six clean sheets in a row between 3 June and 16 July.

Cherrie signed for Airtricity League and FAI Cup champions Cork City F.C. on 17 January 2018.

Career statistics

Honours

Dundalk
League of Ireland (1): 2014
League of Ireland Cup (1): 2014
President's Cup (1): 2021

Cliftonville
Northern Ireland Football League Cup (1): 2014–15

See also
Clyde F.C. season 2005-06 | 2006–07 | 2007–08 | 2008–09

References

External links

Living people
1983 births
Footballers from Bellshill
Scottish footballers
Airdrieonians F.C. players
Ayr United F.C. players
Clyde F.C. players
Dundalk F.C. players
Cliftonville F.C. players
Bray Wanderers F.C. players
Cork City F.C. players
Derry City F.C. players
League of Ireland players
Scottish Football League players
Association football goalkeepers